The governor of Cagayan, is the chief executive of the provincial government of Cagayan.

List of governors of Cagayan

There have been twenty nine (29) provincial governors of Cagayan since the establishment of the civil government in 1901 after the Philippine-American War.

References

Cagayan